Ivan Wilhelm (1 May 1942, Trnava) is a Czech nuclear physicist and former rector of the Charles University in Prague.

Wilhelm graduated from the Faculty of Nuclear Sciences and Physical Engineering of Czech Technical University in Prague with a degree in nuclear physics. Until 1967, he also lectured there. In 1967, Wilhelm was sent to study in the United States. Since 1971, Wilhelm has been a part of the Faculty of Mathematics and Physics of Charles University in Prague.

See also 
List of Charles University rectors

References 

1942 births
Living people
Czech physicists
Czech nuclear physicists
People from Trnava
Czech Technical University in Prague alumni
Rectors of Charles University